The 2015 Judo Grand Prix Qingdao was held at the Guoxin Gymnasium in Qingdao, China from 20 to 22 November 2015.

Medal summary

Men's events

Women's events

Source Results

Medal table

References

External links
 

2015 IJF World Tour
2015 Judo Grand Prix
Judo
Judo competitions in China
Judo